Tillandsia clavigera is a species in the genus Tillandsia. This species is native to Venezuela, Colombia, Peru, and Ecuador.

Two varieties are recognized:

Tillandsia clavigera var. clavigera - most of species range
Tillandsia clavigera var. pendula Rauh - Pasco region of Peru

References

clavigera
Plants described in 1896
Flora of South America